John Brown Francis (1791–1864) was a U.S. Senator from Rhode Island from 1844 to 1845, also serving in the Rhode Island State Senate. Senator Francis may also refer to:

Charles Asa Francis (1855–1934), New Jersey
Peter D. Francis (born 1934), Washington State Senate